John Crowley (1870–1934) was an Irish Sinn Féin politician and medical practitioner.

Education and medical career
Crowley received his early education in his home town of Cork. He attended the University of Glasgow and the Royal University of Edinburgh in Scotland where he obtained a medical degree. He practised medicine for 33 years, primarily in Ballycastle, County Mayo.

Political career
He was elected as a Sinn Féin MP for the Mayo North constituency at the 1918 general election, defeating incumbent Daniel Boyle of the Irish Party in a landslide of 7,429 to 1,861. In January 1919, Sinn Féin MPs refused to recognise the Parliament of the United Kingdom and instead assembled at the Mansion House in Dublin as a revolutionary parliament called Dáil Éireann. 

During the Irish War of Independence he also held the rank of Battalion Commandant in the Irish Republican Army and as a consequence he was a high priority target for the Royal Irish Constabulary and the Black and Tans. On one occasion he was seized upon in the night at his home by crown forces who beat him and threw him into a lorry bound for Ballina. However, mid-journey he was able to jump out and escape into the night while being shot at. Subsequently, he went on the run as he could not return home. For a time he returned to County Cork. 

He was elected unopposed as a Sinn Féin Teachta Dála (TD) for the Mayo North and West constituency at the 1921 elections. He opposed the Anglo-Irish Treaty and voted against it, stating: 

He was re-elected unopposed for the same constituency at the 1922 general election, this time as an anti-Treaty Sinn Féin TD, and he did not take his seat in the Dáil. Crowley joined fellow anti-Treaty volunteers in opposing the Free State Government and was held for a time in Ballina Workhouse - to be released with other IRA prisoners when the anti-Treaty IRA briefly seized the town on 12 September 1922. He was elected as a Republican TD for Mayo North constituency at the 1923 general election and once again he did not take his seat. He did not contest the June 1927 general election.

Personal life
Crowley was a practising Roman Catholic. He married Julia Catherine Larkin of Tralee in September 1902. They had five children, four daughters and one son, Finbar, who died at the age of 3.

Death
Crowley died in 1934 at the age of 64.  His burial mass was at St. Brigid's Church in Ballycastle and presided over by the Most Rev. Dr. Naughton, Bishop of Killala.  In attendance at his funeral were  P. J. Ruttledge, the Minister for Justice, then President of Sinn Féin Father Michael O'Flanagan, John J. O'Kelly, and many other politicians in addition to over 1,000 IRA members. He was buried in Doonfeeny Cemetery with his son Finbar.

References

1870 births
1934 deaths
Alumni of the University of Edinburgh
Alumni of the University of Glasgow
Early Sinn Féin TDs
Irish general practitioners
Members of the 1st Dáil
Members of the 2nd Dáil
Members of the 3rd Dáil
Members of the 4th Dáil
Members of the Parliament of the United Kingdom for County Mayo constituencies (1801–1922)
People from Cork (city)
Politicians from County Mayo
UK MPs 1918–1922